Eucalyptus biturbinata, commonly known as grey gum, is a tree native to New South Wales and Queensland in eastern Australia. It is regarded as a synonym of E. punctata by the Australian Plant Census.

References

biturbinata
Myrtales of Australia
Flora of New South Wales
Flora of Queensland
Trees of Australia